Rizky Rizaldi Pora (born 22 November 1989) is an Indonesian professional footballer who plays as a winger or left-back for and captains Liga 1 club Barito Putera.

Club career

Barito Putera (2016)
Rizky certainly remains in PS Barito Putera. he made his debut in 2016 season against Bali United In first week 2016 Indonesia Soccer Championship A. he made his first goal in the 45th minute against Persija Jakarta in fifth week.

On the sixth week, he scored again when against Persipura Jayapura in the 20th minute. Although the end result lost 4–5.

On eighth week against Persela Lamongan, he scored with a free kick in the 7th minutes.

International career
He made his debut with Indonesia on 21 June 2014 in a friendly against Pakistan.

Career statistics

International

International goals
Scores and results list Indonesia's goal tally first.

Honours

International
Indonesia
 AFF Championship runner-up: 2016

Individual
 2016 AFF Championship: Best Eleven
 ASEAN Football Federation Best XI: 2017

References

External links
 
 

1989 births
Living people
People from Ternate
Sportspeople from North Maluku
Indonesian footballers
Persita Tangerang players
PS Barito Putera players
Liga 1 (Indonesia) players
Indonesian Premier Division players
Association football fullbacks
Association football wingers
Indonesia international footballers